The Sergeant Major of the South African Army is the most senior Warrant Officer in the South African Army. The post was created in 1967.  It is a singular appointment – it is only held by one person at any time. The Sergeant Major of the Army reports to the Chief of the Army and is responsible for maintaining discipline in the Army

Rank and insignia

Rank

Before 2008 all Sergeant Majors of the Army held the rank of Warrant Officer Class 1, with appointment to the position of Sergeant Major of the Army.
In 2008 the SANDF expanded the Warrant Officer ranks and the Sergeant Major of the Army now holds the rank of Senior Chief Warrant Officer.

Insignia
Prior to 2002 the Sergeant Major of the Army had a unique rank insignia, consisting of a Warrant Officer class 1 insignia with the South African Army badge above it. 

After the Warrant Officer rank redesign the Sergeant Major of the Army does not have a unique rank insignia, but rather uses the rank insignia of the rank of Senior Chief Warrant Officer.

List of officeholders

|-style=text-align:center
| rowspan=2| 13
| rowspan=2| 
| rowspan=2| SCWONcedakele Mtshatsheni
| style="background:#E6E6AA| 1 October 2016
| style="background:#E6E6AA| 31 January 2017
| style="background:#E6E6AA| 
| rowspan=2| 
|-style=text-align:center
| 1 February 2017
| Incumbent
|

See also
 South African military ranks

References

Military history of South Africa
Military ranks of South Africa
South African Army personnel
Lists of South African military personnel
Warrant officers